The canton of Montmédy is an administrative division of the Meuse department, northeastern France. Its borders were modified at the French canton reorganisation which came into effect in March 2015. Its seat is in Montmédy.

It consists of the following communes:
 
Avioth
Azannes-et-Soumazannes
Bazeilles-sur-Othain
Brandeville
Bréhéville
Breux
Chaumont-devant-Damvillers
Chauvency-le-Château
Chauvency-Saint-Hubert
Damvillers
Delut
Dombras
Écouviez
Écurey-en-Verdunois
Étraye
Flassigny
Gremilly
Han-lès-Juvigny
Iré-le-Sec
Jametz
Juvigny-sur-Loison
Lissey
Louppy-sur-Loison
Marville
Merles-sur-Loison
Moirey-Flabas-Crépion
Montmédy
Peuvillers
Quincy-Landzécourt
Remoiville
Réville-aux-Bois
Romagne-sous-les-Côtes
Rupt-sur-Othain
Thonne-la-Long
Thonne-le-Thil
Thonne-les-Près
Thonnelle
Velosnes
Verneuil-Grand
Verneuil-Petit
Vigneul-sous-Montmédy
Villécloye
Ville-devant-Chaumont
Vittarville
Wavrille

References

Cantons of Meuse (department)